Denna Frank Fleming (1893–1980) was an American historian and political scientist, who is best known for his work The Cold War and Its Origins. He was born in Ohio.

Works
The Treaty Veto of the American Senate, 1930
The United States and the League of Nations, 1918-1920, 1932
The United States and World Organization, 1920-1933, 1938
Can We Win the Peace, 1943
While America Slept, 1944
The United States and the World Court, 1945
The Cold War and Its Origins, Vol I, 1917-1950, 1961
The Cold War and Its Origins, Vol II, 1950-1960, 1961
The Origins and Legacies of World War I, 1968
America's role in Asia, 1969
The Issues of Survival, 1972

References

External links
Denna Frank Fleming Papers
Chronology (of his life)
Big Wars and Small; New York Review of Books
Origin of the Cold War, Review by Alan Milchman 

20th-century American historians
American male non-fiction writers
1893 births
1980 deaths
20th-century American male writers